The enzyme rhamnulose-1-phosphate aldolase catalyzes the chemical reaction

L-rhamnulose 1-phosphate  glycerone phosphate + (S)-lactaldehyde

This enzyme belongs to the family of lyases, specifically the aldehyde-lyases, which cleave carbon-carbon bonds.  The systematic name of this enzyme class is L-rhamnulose-1-phosphate (S)-lactaldehyde-lyase (glycerone-phosphate-forming). Other names in common use include rhamnulose phosphate aldolase, L-rhamnulose 1-phosphate aldolase, L-rhamnulose-phosphate aldolase, and L-rhamnulose-1-phosphate lactaldehyde-lyase.  This enzyme participates in pentose and glucuronate interconversions and fructose and mannose metabolism.

Structural studies

References

 
 

EC 4.1.2
Enzymes of known structure